The  Medical, Dental and Pharmacy Act, 1928 (Act No. 13 of 1928) was a South African law that prohibited the production, sale, and use of any "habit forming drugs." One impact of this was to restrict the use of cannabis in South Africa.

The 1928 act stated in Article 69:

Per Vera D. Rubin, following this act only one license was issued for cultivating cannabis in South Africa, and one license for exporting cannabis, and neither was later renewed.

References

1928 in cannabis
1928 in South African law
Cannabis in South Africa
Drugs in South Africa